Jijan Kuh (also Romanized as Jījān Kūh; also known as Jeyḩān Kūh, Jījeyān Kūh, Jījīān Kūh, and Jijiyan Kooh) is a village in Seyyed Shahab Rural District, in the Central District of Tuyserkan County, Hamadan Province, Iran. At the 2006 census, its population was 1,450, in 323 families.

References 

Populated places in Tuyserkan County